The Nothing But a Good Time Tour was a concert tour headlined by the American glam metal band Poison. Cheap Trick and Pop Evil provided support throughout the tour. The tour began May 18, 2018 at Five Points Amphitheatre in Irvine, California and ended July 1, 2018 at the Hard Rock Events Center in Hollywood, Florida.

Setlists 
The following setlists were taken from the June 30, 2018 tour date at the Daily's Place Amphitheater in Jacksonville, Florida and may not be representative of all dates on the tour:

Pop Evil setlist
 Boss's Daughter
 Ex Machina
 Deal With the Devil
 Be Legendary
 100 in a 55
 Take It All
 Footsteps
 Waking Lions
 Trenches

Cheap Trick setlist
 Hello There
 You Got It Going On
 Big Eyes
 California Man (The Move cover)
 Blood Red Lips
 Southern Girls
 The Summer Looks Good On You
 Bass solo
 I'm Waiting for the Man (The Velvet Underground cover)
 The Flame
 I Want You To Want Me
 Dream Police
 Never Had a Lot to Lose
 Surrender
 Goodnight Now

Poison setlist
 Look What the Cat Dragged In
 I Want Action
 Ride the Wind
 Talk Dirty to Me
 Something to Believe In
 Your Mama Don't Dance (Loggins & Messina cover)
 Guitar solo
 Fallen Angel
 Unskinny Bop
 Drum solo
 Bass solo
 Every Rose Has Its Thorn
 Nothin' but a Good Time
Encore
 Rock and Roll All Nite (Kiss cover)

Tour dates

References 

2018 concert tours